Yiftah (lit. He will open) is a kibbutz in northern Israel. Located near the Lebanese border and Kiryat Shmona, it falls under the jurisdiction of Upper Galilee Regional Council.

History
Kibbutz Yiftah was established on 18 August 1948 by demobilised Palmach soldiers who were members of the Yiftach Brigade, after which the kibbutz is named. Metzudat Koach is located nearby.

Yiftah is located near Jahula, but on the land belonging to the depopulated Palestinian village of Qadas.

Historic images

Notable people

 Yiftach Ziv (born 1995), Israeli basketball player

References

External links
Kibbutz website 

Kibbutzim
Kibbutz Movement
Populated places established in 1948
Populated places in Northern District (Israel)
1948 establishments in Israel